Ramius can refer to the following fictional characters:

 Marko Ramius, a Soviet submarine captain in The Hunt for Red October, Tom Clancy's debut novel and the film adaptation
 Murrue Ramius, the captain of the Archangel of Cosmic Era Mobile Suit Gundam SEED
 Ramius, a minor Goa'uld from the fictional Stargate universe